Hide-A-Way Lake is an unincorporated community and census-designated place in Pearl River County, Mississippi, United States. Its population was 2,065 as of the 2020 census.

Geography

Demographics 

As of the 2020 United States census, there were 2,065 people, 957 households, and 651 families residing in the CDP.

References

Unincorporated communities in Pearl River County, Mississippi
Unincorporated communities in Mississippi
Census-designated places in Pearl River County, Mississippi
Census-designated places in Mississippi